Prorella remorata is a moth in the family Geometridae first described by John Arthur Grossbeck in 1907. It is found in the US state of Arizona.

The wingspan is about 18 mm. The forewings are light ocherous with brown spotting, varying from pale fawn to a more distinct light wood brown. Adults have been recorded on wing in March and August.

References

Moths described in 1907
Eupitheciini